The 1990–91 Northeastern Huskies men's basketball team represented Northeastern University during the 1990–91 college basketball season. Led by head coach Karl Fogel, the Huskies competed in the North Atlantic Conference and played their home games at Matthews Arena. They finished the season 22–11, 8–2 in NAC play to win the regular season conference title. They followed the regular season by winning the North Atlantic Conference tournament to earn a bid to the NCAA tournament.

Roster

Schedule and results

|-
!colspan=9 style=| Regular season

|-
!colspan=9 style=| NAC Tournament

|-
!colspan=9 style=| NCAA Tournament

References

Northeastern Huskies men's basketball seasons
Northeastern
Northeastern